Tyler Spindel is an American comedian, actor and director. He is best known for his work on The Wrong Missy and The Out-Laws.

References

External links 

 

Living people
American television directors
American film directors
American male film actors
21st-century American male actors
21st-century American comedians
Harvard University alumni
Year of birth missing (living people)